Warrensville–Van Aken (signed as Warrensville) is a station stop on the RTA light rail Blue Line in Shaker Heights, Ohio. It is the eastern terminus of the Blue Line.

The station is located at the median of Van Aken Boulevard near the intersection of Warrensville Center Road, Chagrin Boulevard (U.S. Route 422), Van Aken Boulevard, and Northfield Road (Ohio State Route 8).

History
The station opened when the Van Aken line was extended east from Lynnfield Road. The extension opened on July 30, 1930 at the same time that trains began using Cleveland Union Terminal.
The station originally included a car yard with a reverse U for turning the trains around. A passenger station building was constructed within the radius of reverse loop in 1932. However, because of the need to generate income, the building was never used as a passenger station but was leased for use as a Texaco service station. In 1948, the reverse U was replaced by a regular turnaround loop.

In 1980 and 1981, the Green and Blue Lines were completely renovated with new track, ballast, poles and wiring, and new stations were built along the line. The Warrensville station was rebuilt with a new platforms, a new car yard and a new power substation. The renovated line along Van Aken Boulevard opened on October 30, 1981.

The car yard was not needed after RTA opened its Central Rail Maintenance Facility on April 29, 1984 at East 55th Street.
The loop was closed after RTA ended its use of PCC cars and relied completely upon the LRVs that comprise the current fleet.

There have been several proposals to extend the Blue Line beyond Warrensville station.

The proposal most recently considered would be a 2-mile (3-km) extension into and around the 600-acre (2.4-km²) Chagrin Highlands development near Harvard Road and I-271. The proposed route would travel along Northfield Road south, and then turns east along Mill Creek Pond Dr., traveling parallel to Harvard Road. The line would terminate somewhere between Richmond and Green Roads.

Station layout

The station has two side platforms, with an additional storage track south of the platform.

Notable places nearby
 The Van Aken District (retail, restaurant, offices)
Tower East
 Canterbury Golf Club

References

External links

1930 establishments in Ohio
Railway stations in the United States opened in 1930
Blue Line (RTA Rapid Transit)